Rubus trifidus is a Japanese species of brambles, related to blackberries and raspberries.

Rubus trifidus has palmately lobed leaves with large teeth along the edges. Flowers are white. Fruits are orange.

References

External links
 Asian flora, Rubus trifidus Thunb. photos
 

Flora of Japan
trifidus
Plants described in 1784